Imperial was an unincorporated community in Lee County, Virginia, United States.

References

Unincorporated communities in Lee County, Virginia
Unincorporated communities in Virginia